Tour Kaputt is a 2011 live album by the progressive rock group The Flower Kings. The CD was recorded at Cultuurpodium Boerderij in Zoetermeer, Netherlands, in 2007, during the tour for The Sum Of No Evil for which the band enlisted as guest drummer Pat Mastelotto of King Crimson fame. The title of the album is a reference to one of the crew's comments after the group's tour bus struck an animal.

Track listing

Disc 1
"Love Is the Only Answer" (from The Sum of No Evil)
"There Is More to This World" (from Retropolis)
"Retropolis" (from Retropolis)
"Trading My Soul" (from The Sum of No Evil)
"Hudson River Sirens Call" (from Flower Power)
"I Am the Sun" (from Space Revolver)

Disc 2
"Life in Motion" (from The Sum of No Evil)
"Brimstone Flight 999" (from The Sum of No Evil)
"Babylon" (from Adam & Eve)
"Stardust We Are" (from Stardust We Are)
"What If God Is Alone" (from Paradox Hotel)
"Blade of Cain" (from Adam & Eve)
"The Sum of No Reason" (from The Sum of No Evil)

References

The Flower Kings albums
2011 live albums